This is a bibliography of books by or about the Brazilian director Luiz Fernando Carvalho.

Books about Luiz Fernando Carvalho works
 Carter, Eli Lee "Luiz Fernando Carvalho: An Auteur of Brazilian Television", UCLA Electronic Theses and Dissertations, 2013

Studies of To the Left of the Father (Lavoura Arcaica)

Studies of Today is Maria's Day (Hoje é Dia de Maria)

Studies of Capitu
 
 
 
 Carter, Eli Lee "Rereading Dom Casmurro - aesthetic hybridity in Capitu", University of Virginia, 2014.

Studies of other TV series
 Carter, Eli Lee "Afinal, o que Querem as Mulheres?: Luiz Fernando Carvalho's Metafictional Critique of Brazilian Television Fiction", University of Virginia, 2014

Further reading

Books by Luiz Fernando Carvalho

External links
 Luiz Fernando Carvalho - - Ateliê Editorial 

Books about film directors
Works by Luiz Fernando Carvalho
Bibliographies by writer